Thangaikkaaga is a 1971 Indian Tamil-language film, directed by D. Yoganand. The film stars Sivaji Ganesan, Vennira Aadai Nirmala and Lakshmi. It was released on 6 February 1971.

Plot 
Ramu and his sister Radha lead a normal life until Ramu's boss, Moorthy, falls in love with Radha. However, in a shocking turn of events, Radha goes missing and Moorthy is murdered.

Cast 
Sivaji Ganesan as Ramu/Ravi
Vennira Aadai Nirmala as Saratha
Lakshmi as Radha/Amutha
Muthuraman as Sekar
M. N. Nambiar as Moorthy/Prakash
S. V. Ramadas as Dass
T. K. Bhagavathi as Paramasivam
T. S. Balaiah as Jambulingam
M. S. Sundari Bai as Arunthathi
Nagesh as Panchatcharam/Cholapatti Chinnajameendar
Sachu as Selvam
V. Nagayya as Samiyar
Ganthimathi as Akilandam
C. R. Parthiban as Head of Police Officer
Typist Gopu as Panchatcharam Friend
Master Prabhakar as Young Ramu
Baby Sumathi as Young Radha

Soundtrack 
The music was composed by M. S. Viswanathan, with lyrics by Kannadasan. The song "Angamuthu" belongs to baila, a Sri Lankan music genre.

References

External links 
 

1970s Tamil-language films
1971 films
Films directed by D. Yoganand
Films scored by M. S. Viswanathan